Joshua "Josh" Turnley (born December 22, 1993) is a former American soccer player.

Career

Youth and college 
Turnley played four years of college soccer at Georgetown University between 2012 and 2015.

While at college, Turnley also appeared for Premier Development League side D.C. United U-23 in 2015.

Turnley graduated from Beaver Area High School in 2012. He played soccer throughout high school for the Beaver Bobcats

Professional 
On January 19, 2016, Turnley was selected 42nd overall in the 2016 MLS SuperDraft by LA Galaxy.

Turnley signed with LA Galaxy's United Soccer League side LA Galaxy II on March 21, 2016.

On January 9, 2018, Turnley signed with Sacramento Republic FC for the 2018 season. He was released by Sacramento on November 30, 2018.

References

External links 
 Georgetown Profile
 

1993 births
Living people
American soccer players
Association football defenders
D.C. United U-23 players
Georgetown Hoyas men's soccer players
LA Galaxy draft picks
LA Galaxy II players
People from Beaver, Pennsylvania
Sacramento Republic FC players
Soccer players from Pennsylvania
Sportspeople from the Pittsburgh metropolitan area
USL Championship players
USL League Two players